State Route 118 (SR 118) is a  state highway in the northwestern part of the U.S. state of Alabama.

History

Prior to the completion of sections of Interstate 22 (I-22), SR 118 served only as the unsigned partner route of U.S. Route 278 (US 278) between the Mississippi state line, west-southwest of Sulligent, and Guin. The current eastern terminus of the highway is in the western part of Jasper, at an intersection with SR 69.

Route description

Much of SR 118 is aligned along a narrow two-lane road. At Carbon Hill, the highway briefly expands to four lanes, only to revert to a two-lane road as it heads southeasterly towards Jasper. SR 118 starts at US 278 at the Mississippi state line, intersecting US 43/SR 171. It has an interchange with I-22/US 78/SR 4 east of Carbon Hill and again west of Jasper before it ends at SR 69.

Major intersections

See also

References

118
Transportation in Lamar County, Alabama
Transportation in Marion County, Alabama
Transportation in Walker County, Alabama
U.S. Route 78